Joseph William Coulter was an  Anglican priest: the Archdeacon of Wilts until 1951.

Born in 1867, he was educated at Trinity College, Dublin. He was ordained in 1897 and began his career with curacies in Ferns and Swanage. He held incumbencies at Langton Matravers, Bridport and Calne.

He died on 10 April 1956.

References

1867 births
Alumni of Trinity College Dublin
Archdeacons of Wilts
1956 deaths